Nada Es Igual may refer to:

 Nada Es Igual... (Luis Miguel album) (1996), by Mexican artist Luis Miguel
 Nada es igual (Franco De Vita album) (1999), by Venezuelan artist Franco De Vita
 Nada Es Igual (Chenoa album) (2005), by Spanish artist Chenoa
Nada Es Igual (Kudai song)